Amarpur Assembly constituency is one of 243 constituencies of legislative assembly of Bihar. It is part of  Banka Lok Sabha constituency along with other assembly constituencies viz. Dhoraiya, Katoria, Belhar and Banka. The current MLA is Jayant Raj Kushwaha of Janata Dal (United).

Overview
Amarpur comprises CD Blocks Shambhuganj & Amarpur.

Members of Legislative Assembly

Election results

2020

2015

2010

References

External links
 

Politics of Banka district
Assembly constituencies of Bihar